It'z Me (stylized as IT'z ME) is the second Korean extended play by the South Korean girl group Itzy released on March 9, 2020, by JYP Entertainment.  It features 7 tracks, including "Wannabe", the lead single from the EP. The physical release is available in three versions: IT'z, ME and WANNABE. It is their first Korean material since the release of It'z Icy in July 2019. It'z Me features a collaboration with Dutch DJ and electronic music producer Oliver Heldens. It was produced by Galactika, Oak Felder, Oliver Heldens, earattack, Shim Eunji, Collapsedone, Jin by Jin, SOPHIE and KASS. Musically, it is a K-pop record that contains influences of dance, hip hop and rock.

It'z Me debuted at number one on the Gaon Album Chart, moving 126,000 units in its first month. It also debuted at number five on the US Billboard World Albums chart. The album received generally positive reviews from critics, who commended Itzy's overall sound becoming harder and featuring more electronic productions.

Background and release

On January 28, 2020, it was reported that Itzy had finished filming their music video for a new song and are in the final stages of comeback preparations. It was also revealed that Itzy will return with new music in spring. On February 13, News1 reported that ITZY are in the final stages of preparation to make a comeback on March 9. In the response to the article, JYP Entertainment commented: “It is true that they are preparing to make a comeback with March 9 in mind. The date will be announced once it is confirmed.” It'z Me is Itzy's third 'It'z' series following It'z Different and It'z Icy. The EP was released on March 9, 2020, through several music portals including iTunes.

Music and composition
At seven tracks,  It'z Me is the longest EP in Itzy's catalogue. The album's overall sound becomes harder and it features also more electronic productions. Musically, It'z Me is a K-pop record that contains influences of dance, hip hop and rock and continues to show the girl group exploring new areas in the K-pop scene and carving out their own musical identity.

The lead single from the album, "Wannabe", employs a churning combo of house and hip-hop/pop production for the girls to mix in a bubblegum-pop melodies and proclaim create a confident beat for the girls to get down to. It was written and produced by Galactika, who also helmed their debut track "Dalla Dalla". Itzy's collaboration with Heldens, “Ting Ting Ting” is a "rowdy-yet-fierce EDM cut" that sends forth swarming determination and courage. "That's a No No" has the loudest beat which complements the powerful raps and vocals of the members. "Nobody Like You" is a rock song, is about someone who establishes an admiration for someone. "You Make Me" clamors curiosity for someone whom she developed feelings with and made her speechless. "I Don't Wanna Dance" is a song with EDM elements. The song possesses party vibe with a distinguishable repetitive lyrics. "24Hrs" is a "quirky-pop stomper" that indicates the girls’ full existence for “24 Hrs”. The song also claims their freedom and self-determination to what comes their way.

Promotion
On February 18, the first group teaser was released. The next day the second group teaser was revealed. Itzy then unveiled the third group teaser photo on February 20. On February 23, Yeji's teaser posters were revealed. On the following day, individual teaser photos of Lia were dropped. Ryujin's teaser posters were revealed on February 25. Chaeryeong’'s teaser posters were revealed the next day. Yuna's teaser posters were finally revealed on February 27. On the first day of March, the official tracklist of the album was revealed. The music video teasers were released on March 4 and March 5.

Singles
"Wannabe" was released on March 9, 2020, as the lead single from the album. On the same day, the music video of the song was released on YouTube. The music video was directed by the Naive Creative Production. Within 24 hours, the music video accumulated over 11 million views and has, as of April 2020, accumulated more than 100 million views on the platform making their fastest music video to reach that. Commercially, the single reached the charts in eight countries, peaking at number six in South Korea. The song also debuted at number 4 on the US World Digital Song Sales chart. It also became the group's first top-five entry since "Dalla Dalla" and their third top-ten entry overall, respectively. In New Zealand the song peaked at number 22 on the Hot Singles chart. In Japan "Wannabe" debuted and peaked at number 23, making it their highest peak on that chart. "Wannabe" also marks the group's debut on the Canadian Hot 100 at number 92, becoming only the seventh K-pop female act to appear on the chart (after CL, Red Velvet and Twice). The song topped the charts in Malaysia and Singapore, becoming their first number-one song on both charts.

Live performances
Itzy promoted the album and its songs on several live performances. On March 12, 2020, the group made the debut performance of 'Wannabe" on M Countdown. On March 13, they performed the song on Music Bank. Itzy performed the song again on Show! Music Core on March 14. On March 15, Itzy performed the song on Inkigayo. On March 20, the song was again performed on Music Bank. On April 4, Itzy performed the song on Show! Music Core. On April 6, they performed "Wannabe" once again on Inkigayo.

Critical reception

Writing for IZM Kim Do-heon was mixed in his review, praising "The five members of Yeji, Lia, Ryujin, Chaeryeong, and Yuna in Wannabe's refrain, I don't wanna be somebody / Just wanna be me Exclaim. Contrary to intention, however, there are traces of numerous' Wannabe 'like the song title at this point where the members' voices are gathered together. JYP's unique and vibrant image is gathered in a combination of two-one-one melody and refrain of metal guitar riff, five-member composition and vocal operation overlapping Blackpink and Red Velvet, and inherited from Miss A and Twice."

Writing for Billboard, Jeff Benjamin said that "Itzy continue their string of empowering and confident singles with the most striking difference in It'z Me coming from the group's overall sound becoming harder and featuring more electronic productions."

Commercial performance
"Wannabe" debuted at number 6 on the Gaon Digital Chart, giving the group their third top ten song. The song debuted at number 4 on the US World Digital Song Sales chart. It also became the group's first top-five entry since "Dalla Dalla" and their third top-ten entry overall, respectively. In New Zealand the song peaked at number 22 on the Hot Singles chart. In Japan "Wannabe" debuted and peaked at number 23, making it their highest peak on that chart. "Wannabe" also marks the group's debut on the Canadian Hot 100 at number 92, becoming only the fifth K-pop female act to appear on the chart. The song topped the charts in Malaysia and Singapore, becoming their first number-one song on both charts.

On March 21, It'z Me debuted and peaked at number 5 on the US Billboard World Albums chart, but did not make an impact on the Billboard Heatseekers Albums. According to Hanteo, the album went on to sell over 34,000 physical copies on the first day of availability, selling twice as many copies as  It'z Icy. The extended play also debuted atop the Gaon Weekly Album Chart, becoming their first number one album in the country. It has also debuted and peaked at number 27 in Poland,  marking it their first ever appearance on a European chart.

Track listing

Charts

Certifications and sales figures

Release history

See also
List of Gaon Album Chart number ones of 2020
List of K-pop songs on the Billboard charts
List of K-pop albums on the Billboard charts
List of number-one songs of 2020 (Malaysia)
List of number-one songs of 2020 (Singapore)

References

2020 EPs
Itzy EPs
Korean-language EPs
JYP Entertainment EPs
Albums produced by Oak Felder